The orange-naped snake (Furina ornata), also known as the moon snake, is a small venomous reptile native to northern and northwestern Australia.

References 

Venomous snakes
Furina
Snakes of Australia
Reptiles described in 1842